Mitrofanikha is a rural locality (a village) in Kopninskoye Rural Settlement, Sobinsky District, Vladimir Oblast, Russia. The population was 46 as of 2010. There are 3 streets.

Geography 
Mitrofanikha is located on the Silunikha River, 22 km southwest of Sobinka (the district's administrative centre) by road. Zarechnoye is the nearest rural locality.

References 

Rural localities in Sobinsky District